The Atom Araullo Specials is a Philippine television documentary show broadcast by GMA Network. Hosted by Atom Araullo, it premiered on April 1, 2018 on the network's Sunday Grande sa Hapon line up.

The show is streaming online on YouTube.

Overview

The show features social issues of the Philippines, along with stories of Filipinos which host Atom Araullo chose to discuss and facilitate.

Episodes

Accolades

References

External links
 

2018 Philippine television series debuts
Filipino-language television shows
GMA Network original programming
GMA Integrated News and Public Affairs shows
Philippine documentary television series